Taiwan Cycle Route No.1 (環島1號線) is a 968 km (602 mile) bicycle route around the island of Taiwan.  The route is intended to facilitate the recreational activity of bicycling around the island of Taiwan, which is called huan-dao (環島) in Mandarin Chinese, and is also translated as a "cycle-the-island-trip". The route was developed by the Taiwan (R.O.C.) Ministry of Transportation and Communications and inaugurated on December 30, 2015.  The route is marked with road signs and road markings and it follows a mixture of dedicated bicycle paths, less-traveled country roads, and busier roads with dedicated cycle lanes.  Although the route may be started at any point, the initial 0 kilometer marking is at Songshan Station in Taipei. Cycling the entire route generally takes 9–12 days.

Bicycle culture in Taiwan 

In the 1980s, the bicycle manufacturing company Giant Bicycles became a booming enterprise in Taiwan. The rising popularity of bicycle riding in Taiwan led the government to develop cycling infrastructure in the mid-2000s.   In 2006, the film Island Etude was released, which tells the adventurous story of a deaf Taiwanese man who bicycled the 1000 km journey around the island.  The movie has been credited with sparking the around-island cycle trip – called huan-dao (環島) – to become part of the Taiwanese identity.  Cycling around the island became one of the three "Taiwan triathlon" activities, which include hiking the tallest mountain in Taiwan, the Jade Mountain (Yushan), and swimming across the Sun Moon Lake.

Development of Taiwan Cycle Route 1  

The Taiwanese Ministry of Transportation and Communications (MOTC) began planning an around-the-island cycling route in 2013.  Taiwan Cycle Route No.1 was launched on December 30, 2015.  The project's total budget was NT$1.2 billion (36.4 million USD) and organization required collaboration with the Taiwanese Environmental Protection Administration and the Taiwanese Ministries of Education and the Interior. In addition, the MOTC collaborated with the Taiwanese police force to set up rest stops at police stations around the island. 
In 2015, the MOTC expressed plans to develop a second and third around-island cycle route in the future.

Route details 

The Taiwan Cycle Route No.1 itinerary recommended by the Taiwanese Institute of Transportation (IOT) takes 9 days, and depending on health and fitness, about 3 1/2 to 6 1/2 hours per stage, with an optional addition of two days for sightseeing at Sun Moon Lake. The highest climb of Taiwan Cycling Route No.1 is the Shouka climb, which rises nearly 500 m (1640.42 ft) up the Southern Taiwanese mountains. According to the Taiwanese Institute of Transportation (IOT), Taiwan Cycle Route No.1 has signs and marked lines placed at major intersections, at the intersection of cross-roads greater than 15m, at Y-shape intersections, and at bridges. Furthermore, the IOT has provided markings every 2 km of the route, markings every 500m in downtown areas, signs around rest stations, and mileage markings signs.  The route also includes 122 designated rest-stops for cyclists.  The official route travels counterclockwise around the island, beginning at Songshan station in Taipei. 

– Source:

References

External links
 

Cycleways in Taiwan